Massachusetts House of Representatives' 11th Norfolk district in the United States is one of 160 legislative districts included in the lower house of the Massachusetts General Court. It covers part of Norfolk County. Democrat Paul McMurtry of Dedham has represented the district since 2007.

Towns represented
The current district geographic boundary overlaps with those of the Massachusetts Senate's Bristol and Norfolk district and Norfolk and Suffolk district.

Representatives

See also
 List of Massachusetts House of Representatives elections
 Other Norfolk County districts of the Massachusetts House of Representatives: 1st, 2nd, 3rd, 4th, 5th, 6th, 7th, 8th, 9th, 10th, 12th, 13th, 14th, 15th
 List of Massachusetts General Courts
 List of former districts of the Massachusetts House of Representatives

Images
Portraits of legislators

References

External links

 Ballotpedia
  (State House district information based on U.S. Census Bureau's American Community Survey).
 League of Women Voters of Westwood-Walpole-Dedham

House
Government of Norfolk County, Massachusetts